Heritage Gas Limited is a company based in Dartmouth, Nova Scotia that provides natural gas distribution.

The company receives gas from the Maritimes and Northeast Pipeline system and is regulated under the Utility and Review Board of Nova Scotia.

It currently operates systems in Halifax Regional Municipality, Guysborough County, Cumberland County. Colchester County, Hants County and Pictou County.

Heritage Gas is a subsidiary of TriSummit Utilities Inc..

Communities Served
Amherst 
Dartmouth 
Albro Lake
Brightwood
Burnside
Crichton Park
Crystal Heights
Downtown Dartmouth
Manor Park
Southdale
Tuft's Cove
Woodlawn (Russell Lake West)
Woodside
Halifax
Halifax Peninsula
Downtown Halifax
North End Halifax
South End Halifax
Quinpool District
West End Halifax
Goldboro 
Halifax International Airport 
New Glasgow 
Stellarton
Trenton
Truro
Westville

External links
 Website

Companies based in Halifax, Nova Scotia
Dartmouth, Nova Scotia
Natural gas companies of Canada
Year of establishment missing